Alessandro Mazza was a prelate of the Catholic Church who served as Bishop of Fossombrone from 1569 to 1575.

Biography
On 1 April 1569, Alessandro Mazza was appointed during the papacy of Pope Pius V as Bishop of Fossombrone.
He served as Bishop of Fossombrone until his resignation in 1575.

References

External links and additional sources
 (for Chronology of Bishops)
 (for Chronology of Bishops)

16th-century Italian Roman Catholic bishops
Bishops appointed by Pope Pius V